Matthew Nicholas Biondi (born October 8, 1965) is an American former competitive swimmer and water polo player. As a swimmer, he is an eleven-time Olympic medalist, and former world record-holder in five events.  Biondi competed in the Summer Olympic Games in 1984, 1988 and 1992, winning a total of eleven medals (eight gold, two silver and one bronze).  During his career, he set three individual world records in the 50-meter freestyle and four in the 100-meter freestyle.

At the 1988 Olympic Games in Seoul, Biondi won five gold medals, setting world records in the 50-meter freestyle and three relay events.

Biondi is a member of the International Swimming Hall of Fame and the United States Olympic Hall of Fame.

Early life and athletics 
Biondi started his aquatics career as a swimmer and water polo player in his hometown of Moraga, California. As he moved into his teens, his incredible abilities as a sprint swimmer began to emerge. Though he did not start swimming year-round until he started at Campolindo High School, by his senior year in 1983 Biondi was the top schoolboy sprinter in America with a national high school record of 20.40 seconds in the 50-yard freestyle.

College and international career

1983-84 freshman year 
Biondi accepted a scholarship to attend the University of California, Berkeley, to swim and play water polo, and enrolled in 1983. In his first year, he played on Berkeley's NCAA championship water polo team, and made the consolation finals at the 1984 NCAA Swimming Championships, finishing in ninth place in the 50-yard freestyle and 7th place in both the 100 and 200-yard freestyle events (until 1985 only the top six swimmers advanced to the championship finals) along with a fourth place finish as part of the 400-yard freestyle relay and a second place in the 800 free relay.

1984 Olympics 

In the summer of 1984, Biondi surprised the swimming community by qualifying for a spot on the United States 4×100-meter freestyle relay at the 1984 Los Angeles Olympics with his fourth-place finish in the 100-meter freestyle at the Olympic Trials held in Indianapolis.  He also finished 18th in the preliminaries of the 200-meter freestyle, failing to advance to the finals.  At the Los Angeles Olympics, Biondi swam the third leg of the relay, entering the water in second place, just barely behind the team from Australia.  Thanks to his 49.67 second split time, the U.S. had taken a four-tenths of a second lead by the time that Biondi turned over the race to anchor swimmer Rowdy Gaines.  The U.S. won the gold medal in Olympic and World Record time.

Post-Olympics NCAA swimming and water polo 
In 1985, fresh off of his 1984 Olympics success, Biondi won the 100 and 200-yard freestyle events at the NCAA Championships, setting NCAA and American Records in each event, and contributed relay legs on Cal's victorious 400 and 800-yard freestyle relays, with the 400 free relay team also setting NCAA and American records.  He finished second to Tom Jager of UCLA in the 50-yard freestyle and was part of Cal's second place 400-yard medley relay team.  Thanks in large part to Biondi's efforts, the Cal team finished fourth overall in the team standings.

The next season, 1986, Biondi swept the sprint freestyles, repeating his 1985 victories in the 100 and 200, and adding a win in the 50 with new NCAA and American records in the event.  Cal once again finished first in the 400 and 800 free relays with Biondi anchoring both, but once again fell short in the 400 medley relay finishing third.  By virtue of his three individual victories, Biondi tied with Stanford's Pablo Morales for high-point scorer in the meet in which Cal finished runner-up to Stanford for the team title.

In his final collegiate season, 1987, Biondi repeated as winner in the 50, 100, and 200-yard freestyle events, breaking his own NCAA and American records in all three.  Having broken the 50 free record in both his preliminary heat and again in the final, he became the first swimmer to break four individual NCAA and American records in the same meet.  Once again Cal repeated as champions in the 400 and 800 freestyle relays, yet again they finished third in the 400 medley relay, and for the second straight year Biondi shared the high-point individual title with Morales.  The Bears finished fifth in the team standings.  For his career, Biondi won eight individual NCAA titles and swam on six winning relays.  He broke individual NCAA and American records seven times, and was named the NCAA Swimmer of the Year in 1985, 1986, and 1987.

In his other sport, Biondi was named to an All-American College Water Polo team four times: a third-team selection in 1983, 1985, and 1987, and a second-team selection in 1984.  Biondi's Cal Water Polo teams won NCAA Championships in 1983, 1984, and 1987, and Biondi was voted the team's most valuable player in 1985.

International swimming, 1985-88 
Biondi set the first of his twelve individual swimming world records in 1985. He was the first man to swim the 100-meter freestyle faster than 49 seconds, and by 1988 he owned the ten fastest times swum in that event and held the world record for nearly nine years. He won a total 24 U.S. Championships in the 50, 100, and 200-meter freestyle events, as well as the 100 butterfly. In two World Championships (1986 and 1991), Biondi won 11 medals including six gold. During his career, he was a finalist for the James E. Sullivan Award, the UPI Sportsman of the Year, the U.S. Olympic Committee Sportsman of the Year, and selected twice as the Swimming World magazine Male Swimmer of the World, in 1986 and 1988.

1988 Olympics 

Biondi was involved in one of the closest defeats of any competitor at the 1988 Seoul Olympics. In the 100-meter butterfly final race, he was caught between strokes as he approached the finishing wall. He chose to glide rather than take another stroke, and Biondi was edged out by Anthony Nesty of Suriname by just one one-hundredth (0.01) of a second.

Biondi still won five gold medals, one silver medal, and one bronze medal in the 1988 Olympics, breaking the world records in four of those victories: three in relay races, and one in the 50-meter freestyle, taking just 22.14 seconds for this swim. This was the third time that he had broken or equalled the existing 50-meter freestyle world record.

Biondi's time in the 100-meter freestyle final was the only swim of the competition below 49.00 seconds, and he set a new Olympic record of 48.63 seconds, the second fastest swim at this distance at that time.

1992 Olympics 

At the 1992 Olympics in Barcelona, Biondi won two more gold medals in relays and a silver in the 50-meter freestyle. Following the 1992 Olympics, Biondi retired, which he attributed to multiple factors including lack of financial assistance.

World Championships 

Biondi competed at the World Championships in 1986 and 1991, winning six gold medals.

In 1986, he won three gold medals, one silver and three bronzes to set a record of seven medals at one World Championship meet. (This record has since been matched by Michael Phelps, and passed by Caeleb Dressel with 8 medals.)

Life outside competitive swimming 
Biondi graduated from the University of California, Berkeley, in 1988 with a Bachelor of Arts degree in Political Economy of Industrialized Societies (PEIS).

Biondi married Kirsten Metzger in her home state of Hawaii in 1995. They have three children: sons Nathaniel (Nate), born in 1998, a current senior for the Cal men’s swimming program, and Lucas, born in 2002; and their daughter Makena, born in 2007. They divorced in 2014. Kirsten still resides in Hawaii.

Kirsten Biondi persuaded her husband to continue his education, and he earned his master's degree in education in 2000 at Lewis and Clark College in Portland, Oregon.

In recent years, Biondi has worked as a school teacher and swimming coach in Hawaii. As of 2012, he teaches math and coaches at Sierra Canyon School in the Los Angeles neighborhood of Chatsworth.

Biondi has become active within the masters swimming community, launching an annual masters competition that bears his name. The Matt Biondi Masters Classic was held for the first time on March 23, 2014, in Simi Valley, California. The competition is a one-day, short course yards meet held in conjunction with Biondi's masters club, the Conejo Valley Multisport Masters.

See also 

 Bay Area Sports Hall of Fame
 List of multiple Olympic gold medalists
 List of multiple Olympic gold medalists at a single Games
 List of multiple Olympic medalists at a single Games
 List of multiple Olympic gold medalists in one event
 List of multiple Summer Olympic medalists
 List of Olympic medalists in swimming (men)
 List of University of California, Berkeley alumni
 List of World Aquatics Championships medalists in swimming (men)
 World record progression 50 metres freestyle
 World record progression 100 metres freestyle
 World record progression 4 × 100 metres freestyle relay
 World record progression 4 × 100 metres medley relay
 World record progression 4 × 200 metres freestyle relay

References

External links 
 
 
 
 
 

|-

|-

|-

|-

|-

1965 births
Living people
American male butterfly swimmers
American male freestyle swimmers
California Golden Bears men's swimmers
World record setters in swimming
Lewis & Clark College alumni
Olympic bronze medalists for the United States in swimming
Olympic gold medalists for the United States in swimming
Olympic silver medalists for the United States in swimming
People from Moraga, California
Swimmers at the 1992 Summer Olympics
Swimmers at the 1988 Summer Olympics
Swimmers at the 1984 Summer Olympics
World Aquatics Championships medalists in swimming
Medalists at the 1992 Summer Olympics
Medalists at the 1988 Summer Olympics
Medalists at the 1984 Summer Olympics
Universiade medalists in swimming
Universiade gold medalists for the United States
Universiade silver medalists for the United States
Medalists at the 1985 Summer Universiade